Parapoynx effrenatalis is a moth in the family Crambidae. It was described by Carlos Berg in 1876 and is found in Uruguay.

References

Acentropinae
Moths described in 1876